Li Yitong (born December 23, 1995 in Xi'an, Shaanxi, China) is a Chinese idol singer and actress. She was a member of Team HII of female idol group SNH48.

Early life
Li had developed an interest in manga and Touhou Project game series since her high school days, and during ninth grade, she developed an interest in cosplay. Prior to joining SNH48, she has also been a huge idol of AKB48, and regards Yuki Kashiwagi as her favorite member.

Career
Li took part in the auditions for second-generation members in mid-2013 before becoming one of the official second-generation members on August 18. With the creation of teams on 11 November, she became one of the 24 members of Team NII. On 2 November, Li missed the "Theater no Megami" stage as she had no prior dancing skills. On 16 November, she participated in SNH48's first major concert, "SNH48 Guangzhou Concert", held in the Guangzhou International Sports Arena.

In 2014, after not performing during public performances, Li decided to write more posts on Sina Weibo, allowing her fans to know her better. On March 19, she wrote a long Weibo post, which caused her to rise in popularity, and she eventually ranked sixth in the first General Election on July 26. On August 19, she started university at Shanghai International Studies University. On 12 October, the release of SNH48's EP "UZA" saw Li as part of the Senbatsu, and her first music video appearance, which was shot in South Korea in June. She was involved in writing the script for the 14th episode of SNHello, broadcast on Youku, which received over a million views.

On 31 January 2015, on SNH48 Request Hour Setlist Best 30 2015, Li Yitong performed "Oshibe to Meshibe to Yoru no Chouchou" with Huang Tingting, which ranked fourth, while her performance of "Enjou Rousen" with Feng Xinduo was ranked 10th. On 25 July, Li was ranked third in SNH48's second General Election, receiving 47,134.5 votes, subsequently becoming part of Seine River together with Zhao Jiamin and Ju Jingyi. In October 2015, she was part of Shandong Television's reality program A Song for You, becoming the first SNH48 member to star in such a program. From 11 December onwards, she became one of the hosts for Informal Talks. On 26 December, her performances of "Oshibe to Meshibe to Yoru no Chouchou" and "Ame no Pianist" on SNH48's second Request Time were ranked first and fourth respectively.

On June 27, 2016, Li starred in Studio48 drama Campus Beauty. On July 23, she starred in Hunan Television's variety show, Summer Sweetie. On July 30, during SNH48's third General Election, Li was ranked second with 169,971.4 votes.

On January 7, 2017, she participated in SNH48's third Request Time, of which her song "Temodemo no Namida", performed with Huang Tingting, came in second. On June 9, she starred in web drama Stairway to Stardom. On July 29, during SNH48's fourth General Election, Li came in second with 259478.6 votes. During the I Top Fan Festival on November 19, Li won the "Most Popular Female Artist" award. During the Tencent Star Awards 2017 held on December 3, she won the "New Female Artist of the Year" award.

On January 11, 2018, during the NetEase Attitude Awards 2017, Li won the "Most Popular New Artist of the Year" award. On February 3, during SNH48's fourth Request Time, Li was transferred to Team HII as part of the SNH48 Team Shuffle. On July 28, 2018, with 402,040.40 votes from the public, she ranked #1 overall during the 5th General Election held by SNH48 (Senbatsu Election), thus becoming the new Top Girls Center for the coming year.

On July 27, 2019, Li came in first again during SNH48 Group's sixth General Election. On September 13, she became the second SNH48 member after Ju Jingyi to be elevated to the Star Palace for coming in first for two consecutive years. As such, an individual studio and website were set up to manage her solo activities.

Discography

With SNH48

EPs

Albums
 Mae Shika Mukanee (2014)

With Seine River
 Sweet & Bitter (2015)

Units

SNH48 Stage Units

Concert units

Filmography

Dramas

Variety shows

References

External links
Official Member Profile

1995 births
Living people
SNH48 members
Actresses from Xi'an
Actresses from Shaanxi
21st-century Chinese actresses
Chinese film actresses
Chinese television actresses